The duty of loyalty is often called the cardinal principal of fiduciary relationships, but is particularly strict in the law of trusts.  In that context, the term refers to a trustee's duty to administer the trust solely in the interest of the beneficiaries, and following the terms of the trust.   It generally prohibits a trustee from engaging in transactions that might involve self-dealing or even an appearance of conflict of interest.   Furthermore, it requires a fiduciary to deal with transparency regarding material facts known to them in interactions with beneficiaries.  

Duty of loyalty in corporation law to describe a fiduciary's "conflicts of interest and requires fiduciaries to put the corporation's interests ahead of their own." "Corporate fiduciaries breach their duty of loyalty when they divert corporate assets, opportunities, or information for personal gain."

It is generally acceptable if a director makes a decision for the corporation that profits both him and the corporation.  The duty of loyalty is breached when the director puts his or her interest in front of that of the corporation.

Conditions of self-dealing transaction
 Flagrant Diversion: corporate official stealing tangible corporate assets - "a plain breach of the fiduciary's duty of loyalty since the diversion was unauthorized and the corporation received no benefit in the transaction."
 Self-Dealing: A key player and the corporation are on opposite sides of the transaction or the key player has helped influence the corporation's decisions to enter the transaction. "When a fiduciary enters into a transaction with the corporation on unfair terms, the effect is the same as if he had appropriated the difference between the transaction's fair value and the transaction's price."
Executive Compensation
Usurping Corporate Opportunity
Disclosure to Shareholders
Trading on Inside Information
Selling out
Entrenchment
 The key player's personal financial interest are at least potentially in conflict with the financial interests of the corporation.

Ways the proponent of a self-dealing transaction can avoid invalidation
 By showing approval by a majority of disinterested directors
 Showing ratification by shareholders (MBCA 8.63)
 Showing transaction was inherently fair (MBCA 8.61)

U.S. Model Business Corporation Act
Section 8.60 of the Model Business Corporation Act states there is a conflict of interest when the director knows that at the time of a commitment that he or a related person is 1) a party to the transaction or 2) has a beneficial financial interest in the transaction that the interest and exercises his influence to the detriment of the corporation.

See also
Corporate opportunity
Duty of care (business associations)
Business Judgment Rule
Fiduciary management

References

Corporate law